The Glenbeulah Mill/Grist Mill is located in Glenbeulah, Wisconsin. It was added to the National Register of Historic Places in 1984.

References

Buildings and structures in Sheboygan County, Wisconsin
Grinding mills on the National Register of Historic Places in Wisconsin
Industrial buildings completed in 1857
Grinding mills in Wisconsin
National Register of Historic Places in Sheboygan County, Wisconsin
1857 establishments in Wisconsin

Dams in Wisconsin